Tankadhar Bag (born 7 December 2003) is an Indian professional footballer who plays as a defender for Odisha in the Indian Super League.

Career
Tankadhar Bag made his first professional appearance for Indian Arrows on 10 January 2021 against Churchill Brothers.

Career statistics

Club

Honours
India U20
SAFF U-20 Championship: 2022

References

External links 
 Tankadhar Bag at All India Football Federation

2003 births
Living people
People from Jharsuguda district
Footballers from Odisha
Indian footballers
India youth international footballers
Indian Arrows players
I-League players
Association football defenders